Archibald Winchester "Arch" Johnson (March 14, 1922 – October 9, 1997) was an American actor who appeared on Broadway and in more than 100 television programs.

Early years
Archibald Winchester Johnson was born in Minnesota in 1922. He served in the United States Marine Corps in the Pacific Theater of World War II. Johnson attended the University of Pennsylvania.

Career
Starting out in Philadelphia in the 1940s through 1950s, Johnson worked in community theater both as an actor and director. He began acting with the Plays and Players Theatre in Philadelphia and was part of the world premiere of Stalag 17 while there. After he left Philadelphia, he studied for two years at the Neighborhood Playhouse School of the Theatre in New York.

A stage actor as well and a prolific television character actor, he was in the original production of West Side Story (1957) on Broadway and the revival of that show in 1980, again on Broadway. He was the only actor from the original stage version who returned for the revival, and he toured Europe with the show. He was in the original version of Other People's Money on Broadway and originated the Role of "Jorge" that Gregory Peck played in the film version. 

Johnson had a prolific television career. Among his numerous roles, he was a regular on the 1961 series The Asphalt Jungle as police Captain Gus Honochek, on the 1955-1956 comedy series It's Always Jan, on the 1960-1961 comedy series Peter Loves Mary, and on the 1965–1966 series Camp Runamuck as Commander Wivenhoe.

In 1963, he portrayed the role of Harry Johanson in the episode "Incident at Paradise" on CBS's Rawhide. He made five appearances on Perry Mason, including the role of murder victim Karl Magovern in the 1961 episode "The Case of the Travelling Treasure", as murder victim Gerald Thornton in the 1963 episode, "The Case of the Golden Oranges", and as Marvin Fremont in the 1964 episode, "The Case of the Ice-Cold Hands". He played murderer John Ruskin in the 1960 episode "The Case of the Singular Double". He made four appearances on Daniel Boone and Gunsmoke, five on Bewitched, four on The F.B.I., and scores of others on many other television offerings, including The Twilight Zone, Decoy, Johnny Ringo, Hennesey, Gunsmoke, Bat Masterson, The Roaring 20s, Lawman, Going My Way, Mr. Novak, and Empire and its successor series, Redigo, both with Richard Egan.

In 1963, Johnson appeared on NBC's Western series Laramie as the outlaw Sam Wellman in the episode "No Place to Run". In the story line, Wellman forces a likeable safecracker who is trying to go straight, Gandy Ross, portrayed by Don Durant, formerly Johnny Ringo, to open the safe in the bank at fictitious Granite City. Ellen Burstyn and Tom Skerritt play the roles of Amy and Price in the episode, as Jess Harper rescues his friend Ross from the clutches of Wellman.

In 1961, Johnson appeared as his Gus Honochek character from The Asphalt Jungle in the theatrical film The Lawbreakers. In 1973, Johnson played the part of Combs in the movie The Sting.

Later in life, Johnson tutored literacy programs in Westover, Maryland. He also worked with an Alternatives to Violence program with the Religious Society of Friends.

Personal life
Johnson married Jean. They had five children. After retiring, Johnson moved to the Eastern Shore of Maryland.

Johnson died of cancer on October 9, 1997, at Atlantic General Hospital in Berlin, Maryland.

Filmography

References

External links
 
 
 

1922 births
1997 deaths
American male stage actors
American male film actors
American male television actors
Male actors from Minneapolis
Male actors from New York City
Male actors from Los Angeles
People from Snow Hill, Maryland
Deaths from cancer in Maryland
20th-century American male actors
Western (genre) television actors
University of Pennsylvania alumni
United States Marine Corps personnel of World War II